Rajaputhran is a 1996 Indian Malayalam-language action drama film directed by Shajoon Kariyal, written by Ranjith, and produced by Dinesh Panicker. It stars Suresh Gopi, Vikram, Vijayaraghavan, Shobana and Murali.

The film was simultaneous released in Malayalam, Tamil and Telugu languages. The film was a commercial success at the box office.

Plot

Anand, who is a wildlife photographer by profession, has to return from a tour programme upon hearing the shocking news of the unexpected death of his father, M. K. Nair. He soon had to manage all the business establishments of his father under the guidance of their family friend, Balaraman and his father's adopted son, K. R. Bhadran. Anand is already in love with a girl named Veni, who is the only daughter of a wealthy businessman, Vishwanathan and both the families were arranging everything for the marriage.

As the story progresses, Anand became friends with Manu and his gang and  also with a smuggler, Akbar, who is working for KC. Anand soon realizes that people with him were not trustworthy and they were actually cheating him and his company Sun Marines and were illegally doing smuggling under his company's label and with the help of KC, whose boss is Malabari, a criminal cum businessman. Followed by a string of unexpected events, Anand was left alone, only Anand,Akbar And Manu's Gang Were With Him.

Cast

Suresh Gopi as Anand, aka "Colonel"
Vikram as Manu
Vijayaraghavan as Akbar
Murali as K. R. Bhadran
Shobhana as Veni
Vineetha as Moti
Thilakan as Balaraman
M. G. Soman as Vishwanathan
Nedumudi Venu as M. K. Nair Anand's father 
Narendra Prasad as Vamadevan Karunakaran
N. F. Varghese as Adv. Issac Thomas
Mohan Raj as KC
Sadiq as Prathap Menon
Augustine as Aboobacker
Mamukkoya as Sayed Jabbar Thangal
Tej Sapru as Masood Ali Malabari
Jagannatha Varma as Chief Minister
Kollam Thulasi as Advocate 
Mohan Jose as Police Officer
Shivaji as Ex-minister Thomas Kurian
Subair as Customs officer
Abu Salim as Goonda
Sudheer Sukumaran as Goonda
Manjulan as Goonda

Production
Ranjith originally wrote the screenplay for director Shaji Kailas with Mohanlal in the leading role, titled Emperor. However, the film did not materialised. Producer Dinesh Panicker, who was then searching for a screenplay for Suresh Gopi bought Emperor from Ranjith. Rajaputhran was shot in Thiruvananthapuram, Kollam, Ernakulam, and fight and underwater scenes in Chennai. Filming lasted around 60 - 63 days.

References

External links

1990s Malayalam-language films
1996 action films
1996 films
Indian action films
Films directed by Shajoon Kariyal
Films scored by M. Jayachandran